Juan Carlos Ríos (born 11 May 1972) is a Bolivian footballer. He played in twelve matches for the Bolivia national football team from 1993 to 1995. He was also part of Bolivia's squad for the 1993 Copa América tournament.

References

External links
 

1972 births
Living people
Bolivian footballers
Bolivia international footballers
Place of birth missing (living people)
Association football midfielders
Club Atlético Ciclón players
Club Bolívar players
C.D. Jorge Wilstermann players
Club San José players
The Strongest players
Club Aurora players
Club Petrolero managers
Bolivian football managers